The 1984 Troy State Trojans football team represented Troy State University during the 1984 NCAA Division II football season, and completed the 64th season of Trojans football. The Trojans played their home games in at Veterans Memorial Stadium in Troy, Alabama. The 1984 team came off a 7–4 record from the previous season. The 1984 team was led by coach Chan Gailey. The team finished the regular season with a 9–1 record and made the NCAA Division II playoffs. The Trojans defeated the North Dakota State Bison 18–17 in the National Championship Game en route to the program's first NCAA Division II Football Championship and second overall national championship.

The National Championship Game
The title game between Troy and North Dakota State proved to be a good one, as it pitted the #3-ranked team against the #1-ranked team.  The game was shown nationally on ESPN.

The game was close throughout, with both teams playing good defense in a low-scoring affair.  Troy State trailed 17-15 late in the contest and, with 1:30 remaining in the game, Carey Christensen returned to lead the Trojans on their final drive to try and win the game.  Starting from its own 10-yard line, Troy State eventually reached the NDSU 32 yard-line.  With the clock running and the Trojans out of time-outs, the Trojans and freshman kicker Ted Clem took the field with :08 seconds remaining on the clock as it was ticking down.  Just as time was about to expire, the Trojans got the snap off, and Ted Clem hit a 50-yard field goal to give Troy the lead and the win over North Dakota State.

Schedule

References

Troy
Troy Trojans football seasons
NCAA Division II Football Champions
Gulf South Conference football champion seasons
Troy State